Wenchengia  is a genus from the family Lamiaceae, first described in 1965. It contains only one known species, Wenchengia alternifolia, endemic to Hainan Province in China.

References

Lamiaceae
Endemic flora of China
Monotypic Lamiaceae genera